Ilinx is a kind of play, described by sociologist Roger Caillois, a major figure in game studies.  Ilinx creates a temporary disruption of perception, as with vertigo, dizziness, or disorienting changes in direction of movement.

Caillois identified several categories of play in Les Jeux et Les Hommes (1958, in English as Man, Play and Games ; 2001.) In the book, Caillois described the category of ilinx as games that:

 "...are based on the pursuit of vertigo and which consist of an attempt to momentarily destroy the stability of perception and inflict a kind of voluptuous panic upon an otherwise lucid mind. In all cases, it is a question of surrendering to a kind of spasm, seizure, or shock which destroys reality with sovereign brusqueness."

Caillois's other categories, which should be considered alongside ilinx as any form of play rarely fits wholly and discretely into one category, are "agon", "alea" and "mimesis" (or "mimicry").

External links
Homepage of ilinx. Berlin Journal for Cultural History and Theory

Play (activity)